The Baptist Convention of Nicaragua is a Baptist Christian denomination in Nicaragua. It is affiliated with the Baptist World Alliance. The headquarters is in Managua.

History
The Baptist Convention of Nicaragua has its origins in a mission of the American Baptist International Ministries in 1917.  It is officially founded in 1937.  According to a denomination census released in 2020, it claimed 289 churches and 85,000 members.

See also
 Bible
 Born again
 Baptist beliefs
 Worship service (evangelicalism)
 Jesus Christ
 Believers' Church

References

Baptist denominations in Central America
Evangelicalism in Nicaragua